"VHS" is a song by Swedish singers Benjamin Ingrosso and Cherrie. It was released as digital download and for streaming on 19 March 2021 by TEN Music Group. The song was written by Benjamin Ingrosso, Cherrie and Pontus Persson.

Critical reception
Jonathan Vautrey from Wiwibloggs said, "The pair deliver a smooth pop song that fits in well with Ingrosso’s recent discography. The Swedish stars sing about a relationship that has now dwindled. While Benjamin wants to rekindle things, the metaphor of a VHS tape is used to signify that Cherrie has moved on to other things."

Personnel
Credits adapted from Tidal.
 Pontus Persson – producer, composer, lyricist
 Benjamin Ingrosso – composer, lyricist
 Cherrie – composer, lyricist
 Sören von Malmborg – engineer
 Simon Sigfridsson – mixer

Charts

Certifications

References

 

 
2021 songs
2021 singles
Benjamin Ingrosso songs
Swedish-language songs
Songs written by Benjamin Ingrosso